PCPM may refer to:

 Personal CP/M, a Digital Research operating system
 Political-Military Communist Party
 Pontifical Commission for the Protection of Minors
 Potsdam Center for Policy and Management
 Progressive Conservative Party of Manitoba